Kenneth Hurst Thompson (24 April 1926 – February 2008) was an English professional footballer who played as a full-back in the Football League for Gateshead and York City, and was on the books of Middlesbrough without making a league appearance.

References

1926 births
2008 deaths
Footballers from Sunderland
English footballers
Association football fullbacks
Middlesbrough F.C. players
Gateshead F.C. players
York City F.C. players
English Football League players